The Faculté de médecine is one of four medical schools in Quebec. The faculty is part of the Université Laval and is located in Quebec City.

External links
Faculté de médecine de l'Université Laval (in French)

Université Laval
Medical schools in Canada